The Hispanic National Bar Association (HNBA) is a 501(c)(6) organization representing Hispanics in the legal profession, including attorneys, judges, law professors, legal assistant and paralegals, and law students in the United States and its territories.

History
The organization was founded in California on March 20, 1972, as La Raza National Lawyers Association; its first president was Mario G. Obledo. The organization's name was changed to Hispanic National Bar Association and reincorporated in the District of Columbia in 1984.

Purpose
The Hispanic National Bar Association (HNBA) is an incorporated, not-for-profit, national membership association that represents the interests of over 67,000+ Hispanic attorneys, judges, law professors, legal assistants, law students, and legal professionals in the United States and its territories. Since 1972, the HNBA has acted as a force for positive change within the legal profession by creating opportunities for Hispanic lawyers and by helping generations of lawyers to succeed. The HNBA has also effectively advocated on issues of importance to the national Hispanic community. While we are proud of our accomplishments, we are mindful that our mission is as vital today as it was nearly five decades ago, especially as the U.S. Hispanic population continues to grow.

Activities
The HNBA holds an Annual Corporate Counsel Conference and Moot Court Competition as well as an Annual Convention, an Annual Legislative Day and an Annual International Conference open to all attorneys and affiliates from around the country. Each year, the HNBA also organizes a variety of events for lawyers and law students throughout its 19 regions, and several community outreach and education initiatives.

The HNBA sometimes condemns rhetoric that it perceives as "divisive and racist" and aimed at immigrants. For example, in response to Donald Trump's comments regarding illegal immigration from Mexico to the United States, and Trump's derogatory remarks about some of those immigrants, the group's president issued a press release in July 2015 calling for a boycott of all Donald Trump-owned businesses.  Subsequently, in 2016, Trump criticized a member of the HNBA, Judge Gonzalo P. Curiel, and the President of the HNBA issued a statement defending Curiel.

List of past presidents
Past presidents of the HNBA are as follows:
Mario G. Obledo, 1972–1977
Benjamin Aranda III, 1977–1980
John Roy Castillo, 1980–1981
Robert Maes, 1981–1982
Lorenzo Arredondo, 1982–1983
Mari Carmen Aponte, 1983–1984
Gilbert F. Casellas, 1984–1985
Robert Mendez, 1985–1986
William Mendez, 1986–1987
Michael Martinez, 1987–1988
Mark Gallegos, 1988–1989
Jimmy Gurule, 1989–1990
Robert J. Ruiz, 1990–1991
Dolores Atencio, 1991–1992
Carlos Ortiz, 1992–1993
Wilfredo Caraballo, 1993–1994
Mary T. Hernandez, 1994–1995
Jose Gaitan, 1995–1996
Hugo Chaviano, 1996–1997
Gregory Vega, 1997–1998
Lillian Apodaca, 1998–1999
Alice Velazquez, 1999–2000
Rico Rafael Santiago, 2000–2001
Angel G. Gomez, 2001–2002
Duard D. Bradshaw, 2002–2003
Carlos Singh, 2003–2004
Alan Varela, 2004–2005
Nelson A. Castillo, 2005–2006
Jimmie V. Reyna, 2006–2007
Victor M. Marquez, 2007–2008
Ramona E. Romero, 2008–2009
Roman D. Hernandez, 2009–2010
Diana Sen, 2010–2011
Benny Agosto, Jr., 2011–2012
Peter M. Reyes, Jr., 2012–2013
Miguel Alexander Pozo, 2013–2014
Cynthia D. Mares, 2014–2015
Robert T. Maldonado, 2015–2016
Pedro Torres-Díaz, 2016–2017
Erica V. Mason, 2017–2018
Jennifer Salinas, 2018–2019
Irene Oria, 2019-2020
Elia Diaz-Yaeger, 2020-2021

References

External links
 
  California La Raza Lawyers
  Mexican American Bar Association of Los Angeles County
 Puerto Rican Bar Association website

American bar associations
Organizations established in 1972
Hispanic and Latino American professional organizations
1972 establishments in the United States
501(c)(6) nonprofit organizations